Miloš Okuka (born August 2, 1944 in Porije, near Ulog) is a Serbian linguist, Slavist, dialectologist and literature historian.

After teaching as a professor at the Faculty of Philosophy in Sarajevo, from 1992 till 2009 he served as a lecturer at the University of Munich.

In 2017, Miloš Okuka has signed the Declaration on the Common Language of the Croats, Serbs, Bosniaks and Montenegrins.

Published works
He published several hundred papers, and the following books:

  (Munich, 1975)
  (Sarajevo, 1983)
  (Sarajevo, 1983)
  (Sarajevo, 1984)
  (Sarajevo, 1987)
  (Nikšić, 1990)
 A Bibliography of Recent Literature on Macedonian, Serbo-Croatian, and Slovene languages (Munich, 1990, with Rada Lenecka)
  (Munich, 1991, with Ljilana Stančić)
  (Klagenfurt, 1998)
  - Bosnia and Hercegovina from 100 years ago (Munich - Banjaluka, 1990, with Meha Šoše)
  (Hamburg, 2003)
  (Istočno Sarajevo, 2006)
 , (2008)

Together with Josip Baotić, Miloš Kovačević and Čedomir Rebić, he authored four Serbo-Croatian textbooks for gymnasiums and high-schools in Bosnia and Hercegovina (Sarajevo, 1998-1992). For a number of years he served as the editor-in-chief of the journal Književni jezik. He edited and published several proceedings, lexicons and anthologies:

  (Munich, 1994, with Petra Rehder)
  (Klagenfurt, 1995, with Klaus Olof)
  (Banja Luka, 2001)
  (Klagenfurt, 2002, with Ger Fischer)
  (Klagenfurt, 2002)
  (Sarajevo, 2002)
  (Munich, 2004, with Ulrich Schweier)
  (Sarajevo, 2005)
 Kvarner (Klagenfurt, 2007, with Ger Fischer)
  (Istočno Sarajevo, 2007)
 Mostar (Klagenfurt, 2008, with Ger Fischer)

References

Sources
 

1944 births
Linguists from Serbia
Dialectologists
Living people
Signatories of the Declaration on the Common Language